Ya-ya may refer to one of the following.

 Ya Ya (Lee Dorsey song), a 1961 song by Lee Dorsey, covered by Dalida, Petula Clark and others
 A trombone technique of Tricky Sam Nanton
 Ya! Ya! (1964 album)
 The Ya-Ya series of novels by Rebecca Wells
 Ya-Ya, a traditional drinking song better known as Limerick
 A 1994 album (Ya Ya) and song (Le Yaya) by French Canadian pop star Mitsou 
 Ya Ya (film), a 2013 Tamil language movie.

See also
Yaya (disambiguation)